Civitaluparella is a comune and town in the Province of Chieti in the Abruzzo region of Italy

See also
Castello Caldora

References

Cities and towns in Abruzzo